Stephen David Kirk (born 3 January 1963) is a Scottish former professional footballer who played for East Fife, Stoke City, Partick Thistle, Motherwell, Falkirk, Raith Rovers and Arbroath.

Playing career
Born in Kirkcaldy, Kirk began his career with Fife side East Fife in 1979 and made 25 appearances for the Methil side before moving to English First Division side Stoke City for £10,000 in 1981. He made just twelve appearances for Stoke during the 1981–82 season and after failing to hold down a place in the first team he was released from his contract. 

He returned to Scotland to play for Partick Thistle. Kirk returned to Bayview in 1982 and stayed for four years, scoring 35 times in 135 appearances and famously helping the Fifers beat Hibs in a memorable Scottish Cup third round replay in 1984, the same season East Fife clinched promotion from Division Two. 

In 1986, Kirk began a nine-year association with Motherwell, which saw him play over 300 league games and scoring in each round, would go on to score the winner in the 1991 Scottish Cup final. After leaving Fir Park in 1995, Kirk had spells with Falkirk and Raith Rovers before returning first club in East Fife in 1998, eventually becoming player/manager. Kirk's managerial role lasted some fifteen months before his departure in late 1999. Kirk's last senior club was Arbroath, whom he joined in late 2000, becoming player-manager in December 2003 and leaving the following August. 

From here, Kirk became player/manager at Dundonald Bluebell, adopting a similar position at Lochgelly Albert in September 2006. Kirk was appointed manager of Glenrothes Juniors on 30 June 2009.

On 11 November 2021, it was announced that Kirk was to be inducted into the Motherwell F.C. Hall of Fame.

Career statistics
Source:

Honours
 Motherwell
 Scottish Cup: 1990–91

References

External links
 
 
 

Footballers from Kirkcaldy
1961 births
Living people
Scottish footballers
Scottish Football League players
English Football League players
East Fife F.C. players
Partick Thistle F.C. players
Motherwell F.C. players
Stoke City F.C. players
Falkirk F.C. players
Raith Rovers F.C. players
Arbroath F.C. players
Scottish football managers
East Fife F.C. managers
Arbroath F.C. managers
Scottish Football League managers
Association football forwards